Igor Yevgenyevich Dubrovskikh (born 27 March 1975) is a former Russian professional football player.

External links
 

1975 births
Sportspeople from Krasnodar
Living people
Russian footballers
Association football midfielders
FC Izhevsk players
FC Neftekhimik Nizhnekamsk players
FC Rotor Volgograd players
FC Volgar Astrakhan players
Russian Premier League players
FC Lokomotiv Moscow players
FC Dynamo Makhachkala players
FC Amur Blagoveshchensk players